Greg Dowling (born 15 January 1959) is an Australian former professional rugby league footballer who played in the 1980s and 1990s. An Australian international and Queensland State of Origin representative prop forward, he played his club football mostly in Brisbane with a spell playing for English club, Wigan.

Biography
Greg Dowling was born in Cairns, Queensland on 15 January 1959.

Playing career

A  from Ingham, Queensland, Dowling started his career with the Wynnum-Manly Seagulls. He scored a freakish try during the 1984 State of Origin series. In Game 2, played on a wet and muddy Sydney Cricket Ground, Maroons captain Wally Lewis put up a chip-kick only metres out from the try line. The ball hit the crossbar on the full and bounced back down. Somehow Dowling managed to catch the slippery ball on the full only centimetres from the ground to score under the posts, helping the Maroons to a series winning 14-2 win. His club, Wynnum-Manly won the Brisbane Rugby League premiership final that year.  He also played for the Brisbane Rugby League team that defeated the Eastern Suburbs Roosters in the 1984 National Panasonic Cup Final.

Dowling played at prop forward for Queensland in all three games of the 1985 State of Origin series. Dowling also played in both test matches of the 1985 Kangaroo Tour of New Zealand. He is also remembered for his sideline fight with New Zealand prop Kevin Tamati during the first test of the Trans-Tasman Test series at Lang Park after both players had been sent to the sin-bin by French referee Julien Rascagneres. Both players received an 8-day suspension as a result of the fight.

Greg Dowling played left-, i.e. number 8, in Wigan's 34-8 victory over Warrington in the Lancashire County Cup Final during the 1985–86 season at Knowsley Road, St. Helens, on Sunday 13 October 1985.
He also played prop forward in Wigan's 18-4 victory over Hull Kingston Rovers in the 1985–86 John Player Special Trophy Final during the During the 1985–86 season at Elland Road, Leeds on Saturday 11 January 1986.

Dowling played for Queensland in Game I of the 1986 State of Origin series, scoring a try. At the end of the 1986 season, he was selected to go on the 1986 Kangaroo tour of Great Britain and France, and played at prop forward in every single test match of the tour. Dowling was selected to play for Queensland in all three games of the 1987 State of Origin series, scoring tries in the 1st and second games. He also played in the 4th exhibition match in the United States.

Dowling was contracted to be a member of the foundation team for the Brisbane Broncos in 1988. He was named the 1989 Brisbane Broncos  player of the year. Injury forced him into retirement in 1991.

After retirement
After playing he became a commentator for the ABC and a columnist for the Cairns Post.

In 2000 Dowling was awarded the Australian Sports Medal for his contribution to Australia's international standing in rugby league.

Greg Dowling currently resides in Townsville with two children called Lauren and Lachlan and his wife Rhonda.
After moving on from his McDonald's franchise in Atherton in 2008, he began his retirement. Soon realising this was not for him, he started new project which started at the end of 2009, an Oporto franchise in the Willows Shopping Centre in Townsville.

In April 2019 Dowling was announced as the United Australia Party candidate for Herbert at the 2019 federal election.

In January 2020, Dowling announced he was running as an independent mayoral candidate for Townsville City Council at the 2020 local government elections. Despite contesting the election as an independent, he received an endorsement from Clive Palmer.  Dowling managed to secure 17% of the vote, and was beaten by incumbent mayor Jenny Hill and opponent Sam Cox.

In July 2020, Dowling was announced as a Clive Palmer's United Australia Party candidate for the seat of Townsville at the 2020 Queensland state election, and was also endorsed as the state leader of the party.

References

External links

Greg Dowling at Foley Shield fan site
Greg Dowling at eraofthebiff.com
Queensland Representatives at qrl.com.au

1959 births
Living people
Australian rugby league players
Australian expatriate sportspeople in England
Rugby league players from Cairns
Norths Devils players
Wynnum Manly Seagulls players
Brisbane Broncos players
Rugby league props
Recipients of the Australian Sports Medal
Queensland Rugby League State of Origin players
Australia national rugby league team players
Wigan Warriors players
Brisbane rugby league team players